Bangers and Mash was a single-series radio comedy programme that aired from January to February 1999.  There were six half-hour episodes and it was broadcast on BBC Radio 4.  Written by Katie Hims, and starring Mark Straker, Gerard McDermott, and Catherine Harvey, the show centred on former nun  Martina and her (mis)adventures working for a financially troubled catering company.

Principal Cast 
 Martina - Catherine Harvey
 Kingsley - Mark Straker
 Jimmy - Gerard McDermott
 Juan José - Roger May

References

External links 
 Lavalie, John. "Bangers and Mash." EpGuides. 21 Jul 2005. 29 Jul 2005  <http://epguides.com/BangersandMash/>.

BBC Radio 4 programmes
1999 radio programme debuts